Baron Douglas may refer to:

Baron Douglas, of Ambresbury, Co. Wilts (created 1786 in the Peerage of Great Britain), a subsidiary title held by William Douglas, 4th Duke of Queensberry
Baron Douglas of Douglas, Co. Lanark (created 1790 in the Peerage of Great Britain)
Baron Douglas of Lochleven (created 1791 in the Peerage of Great Britain), a subsidiary title held by George Douglas, 16th Earl of Morton
Baron Douglas of Douglas (created 1875 in the Peerage of the United Kingdom), a subsidiary title held by the Earl of Home
Baron Douglas of Baads (created 1911 in the Peerage of Great Britain), a subsidiary title held by Viscount Chilston
Baron Douglas of Kirtleside (created 1948)
Baron Douglas of Barloch (created 1950 in the Peerage of the United Kingdom)

See also
Lord Douglas (disambiguation)